Constantin II Șerban (? – 1682) was Prince of Wallachia  between 1654 and 1658, illegitimate son to Radu Şerban. According to custom, being born out of wedlock did not disqualify Constantin from becoming prince.

Reign

His rule saw the rebellion of the seimeni mercenaries (1655). In order to deal with the issue, Constantin Şerban allied himself with the Transylvanian Prince George II Rákóczi, including himself in the latter's plans for emancipation from Ottoman rule.

In 1657, the Porte deposed him; Constantin Şerban went on to fight alongside Rákóczi, managing to upset Ottoman presence in Moldavia and briefly occupying the throne in Iaşi, at two different moments (in 1659 and 1661). Paul of Aleppo documents the derelict state of Wallachia during the Ottoman intervention, including an account of the rural population fleeing for the Transylvanian Alps ("where the Wallachians were accustomed to take refuge in time of need").

In 1656, the Prince ordered the building of the Bucharest Metropolitan Cathedral (today: Patriarchal), partly modeled on the Curtea de Argeş Monastery – but larger and more austere. In his honour, the church was given the patronage of Eastern Orthodox Saints Constantine (his namesake) and Helena. In 1658, he set fire to the city, trying to prevent his adversary Mihnea III from making use of its facilities.

See also

References
Gheorghe I. Brătianu, Sfatul domnesc şi Adunarea Stărilor în Principatele Române, Bucharest, 1995
Constantin C. Giurescu, Istoria Bucureștilor. Din cele mai vechi timpuri pînă în zilele noastre, Bucharest, 1966, p. 73-75

External links 
Paul of Aleppo's account of Wallachia
On the construction of the Cathedral (in Romanian)

Rulers of Wallachia
Rulers of Moldavia
Mutilated pretenders to the Wallachian throne
17th-century Romanian people
Year of death unknown
Rulers of Moldavia and Wallachia
Year of birth unknown
Craiovești